Maksym Andriyovych Yermolenko (born 14 May 1998) is a Ukrainian professional footballer who plays as a centre-forward for Ukrainian club Chornomorets Odesa.

References

External links
 Profile on Kramatorsk official website
 
 

1998 births
Living people
Footballers from Kharkiv
Ukrainian footballers
Association football forwards
FC Metalist Kharkiv players
FC Metalist 1925 Kharkiv players
FC Kramatorsk players
FC Chornomorets Odesa players
Ukrainian First League players
Ukrainian Second League players
Ukrainian Amateur Football Championship players